Duvaucel's gecko (Hoplodactylus duvaucelii) is a species of lizard in the family Diplodactylidae. The species is endemic to New Zealand.

Geographic range
H. duvaucelii is found on predator-free offshore islands of New Zealand, including Great Barrier Island and a number of Cook Strait islands. In March 2010 a Duvaucel's gecko was caught in a trap at the nature reserve Maungatautari, indicating that it is likely not extinct from mainland New Zealand. Genetic analysis confirmed that this gecko specimen represents a relic mainland population.

Description
The oldest known wild Duvaucel's gecko was aged at least 36 years.

Duvaucel's gecko is a heavy-bodied lizard with a relatively large head, and long toes with expanded pads.  Its colouration is mainly grey, often with a faint olive-green hue. Usually there are 6 irregular blotches lying across the body from side to side between the back of the head and the base of the tail which is never striped.

Biology
H. duvaucelii is nocturnal but sometimes sun basks. It eats relatively large prey, such as puriri moths and wētā. Fossil evidence suggests that it was once much more widespread, but predation by introduced mammals has ensured its range is now much reduced. Duvaucel's gecko both forages on the ground and is arboreal, living in scrub and forest, and along the shoreline of the islands to which it is presently confined. Females do not lay eggs but give birth to live young.

Etymology
The species H. duvaucelii was erroneously named after Alfred Duvaucel, a French naturalist who explored India. The museum specimens taken to Europe were credited to him, and only later were the animals found to have come from New Zealand.

Conservation efforts
Duvaucel's gecko was reintroduced to the mainland of New Zealand at the end of 2016 when 80 animals were released in the Tāwharanui Open Sanctuary on the Tawharanui Peninsula.

See also
Geckos of New Zealand

References

External links
 Hoplodactylus duvaucelii at the New Zealand Herpetological Society.
 Hoplodactylus duvaucelii discussed on RNZ Critter of the Week, 2 September 2016

Further reading
Bell TP, Herbert SM (2017). "Establishment of a Self-Sustaining Population of a Long-Lived, Slow-Breeding Gecko Species (Diplodactylidae: Hoplodactylus duvaucelii) Evident 15 Years after Translocation". Journal of Herpetology 51 (1): 37–46.
Boulenger GA (1885). Catalogue of the Lizards in the British Museum (Natural History). Second Edition. Volume I. Geckonidæ ... London: Trustees of the British Museum (Natural History). Taylor and Francis, printers). xii + 436 pp. + Plates I-XXXII. (Hoplodactylus duvaucelii, pp. 172-173).
Duméril AMC, Bibron G (1836). Erpétologie générale ou Histoire naturelle complète des Reptiles, Tome troisième [Volume 3]. Paris: Roret. iv + 517 pp. (Platydactylus duvaucelii, new species, pp. 312-314). (in French).
Nielsen SV, Bauer AM, Jackman TR, Hitchmough RA, Daugherty CH (2011). "New Zealand geckos (Diplodactylidae): Cryptic diversity in a post-Gondwanan lineage with trans-Tasman affinities". Molecular Phylogenetics and Evolution 59 (1): 1–22.
Rösler H (2000). "Kommentierte Liste der rezent, subrezent und fossil bekannten Geckotaxa (Reptilia: Gekkonomorpha)". Gekkota 2: 28–153. (Hoplodactylus duvaucelii, p. 90). (in German).

Hoplodactylus
Reptiles of New Zealand
Endemic fauna of New Zealand
Reptiles described in 1836
Taxa named by André Marie Constant Duméril
Taxa named by Gabriel Bibron
Endemic reptiles of New Zealand